The Mezitli Sports Hall is a multi-sport indoor arena located at Mezitli district of Mersin Province, Turkey. It was opened in 1990.

The venue with a seating capacity of 1,500 is suitable for badminton, basketball, boxing, martial arts, volleyball and wrestling events.

Mezitli Sports Hall was used for training activities of judo at the 2013 Mediterranean Games between June 21 and 24.

References

Indoor arenas in Turkey
Sports venues completed in 1990
Basketball venues in Turkey
Volleyball venues in Turkey
Sports venues in Mersin
2013 Mediterranean Games venues
Mezitli District
1990 establishments in Turkey